Mazandaran University of Medical Sciences (abbreviated as MazUMS) is a medical university in Sari, Mazandaran province, Iran. It is one of the top medical universities in Iran.

MazUMS is a type I university of medical Sciences and has more 8,000 students in different programs.

History
Sari Higher School of Midwifery was established in 1975. It was later developed and in 1986 it was recognized as the first educational center in the field of medicine. Following the development of this university, Babol University of Medical Sciences was established in 1983 and Nasibeh School of Nursing and Midwifery was established in 1988. Babol School of Medical Sciences became an independent university in 1370 and Gorgan Medical School was established in 1371. With the disintegration of Golestan province in 1997, Mazandaran University of Medical Sciences established in Sari city.

Faculties
 School of Allied Medical Sciences 
 School of Dentistry
 School of Health
 School of Medicine
School of New Medical Technologies
School of Nursing and Midwifery
 School of Pharmacy

Training Centers
 Sari - Imam Khomeini
Sari - Bu Ali Sina
Sari - Zareh
Sari - Fatemeh Al-Zahra
Ghaemshahr - Razi

Hospitals
 Imam Ali, Amol
Imam Reza, Amol
Imam Khomeini, Amol
17 Shahrivar, Amol
Hazrat Zainab, Babolsar
Imam Khomeini, Behshahr
Khatam al-Anbiya, Behshahr
Shohada, Behshahr
Shahid Rajaei, Tonekabon
Haj Azizi, Juybar
Ayatollah Taleghani, Chalous
Imam Sajjad, Ramsar
Shohada, Zirab
Imam Khomeini, Fereydunkenar
Ghaem, Kelardasht
Samen Al-A'emmeh, Galugah
Shohada, Mahmudabad
Imam Hussein, Neka
Imam Khomeini, Noor
Shahid Beheshti, Noshahr

Specialized clinics 
 Baghban specialized and highly specialized complex 
Shahrvand Comprehensive Kidney Patients Center

Research centers 
 Orthopedics
Cellular and Molecular Biology
Thalassemia
Toxoplasmosis
Laboratory Animals
Diabetes
Gastrointestinal cancer
Psychiatry and Behavioral Sciences
Immune genetics
Sexual and reproductive health
Traditional and complementary medicine
Pediatric Infection
Health Sciences
Pharmaceutical Sciences
Invasive fungi
Cardiovascular
Digestion and liver
Demographic studies
Microbial resistance
Addiction Research Institute
Development of Islamic Education and Health Sciences Research in Region 1
Plant and animal products health
Hemoglobinopathy Research Institute

Research 
MazUMS has published 1674 scientific articles in domestic journals and conferences. MazUMS is the owner and publisher of 6 specialized journals and so far holding 8 conferences. In addition, 6243 authoritative international articles have been published from this center so far. In 1398, researchers at Mazandaran University of Medical Sciences and Health Services published most of their articles with the keywords "cancer" and "breast cancer".

References

External links 
 Mazandaran University of Medical Sciences

Medical schools in Iran
Universities in Iran
Educational institutions established in 1986
Education in Mazandaran Province
Buildings and structures in Mazandaran Province
1986 establishments in Iran